The discography of Christian recording artist Matthew West consists of 7 studio albums, 1 extended play (EP), 22 other appearances, seven music videos and 29 singles.

Discography

Independent albums
 1997 – September Sun
 1998 – Every Step of the Way
 2006 – Sellout

Studio albums

Extended plays

Compilation albums

Holiday albums

Other album appearances
This is a list of other album appearances by Matthew West on various albums.

Singles

Promotional singles

Featured singles

Music videos

Notes

References

Discographies of American artists
Christian music discographies